डाढ़ापीपर is an Indian village in Araria District, Bihar.

References

Geography of Bihar